Sasha Springer-Jones (born 17 March 1978 in Port-of-Spain) is a track and field sprint athlete who competes internationally for Trinidad and Tobago.

Springer-Jones represented Trinidad and Tobago at the 2008 Summer Olympics in Beijing. She competed at the 100 metres sprint and placed fifth in her first round heat, which normally meant elimination. However, her time of 11.55 was among the ten fastest losing times, resulting in a second round spot. There she failed to qualify for the semi finals as her time of 11.71 was the eighth time of her race.

Springer-Jones competed for the University of South Florida in college.

References

1978 births
Living people
Trinidad and Tobago female sprinters
Olympic athletes of Trinidad and Tobago
Athletes (track and field) at the 2008 Summer Olympics
Sportspeople from Port of Spain
University of South Florida olympians
University of South Florida alumni
South Florida Bulls women's track and field athletes
Olympic female sprinters